Robert Spencer may refer to:

 Robert Spencer (artist) (1879–1931), American painter
 Robert Spencer (doctor) (1889–1969), American general practitioner known for his work as an illegal abortion provider in the decades before Roe vs. Wade.
 Robert Spencer, 1st Baron Spencer of Wormleighton (1570–1627), English peer
 Robert Spencer, 1st Viscount Teviot (1629–1694), English politician who sat in the House of Commons from 1660 to 1679
 Robert Spencer, 2nd Earl of Sunderland (1641–1702), English statesman and nobleman
 Robert Spencer, 4th Earl of Sunderland (1701–1729), British peer
 Robert Spencer of Spencer Combe (died 1510), landowner in Devon
 Robert B. Spencer (born 1962), American author and blogger, opponent of Islam
 Robert Cavendish Spencer (1791–1830), English officer of the Royal Navy
 Robert L. Spencer (1920–2014), Beverly Hills hairdresser and fashion designer
 J. Robert Spencer (born 1969), American Broadway actor and singer
 Lord Robert Spencer (1747–1831), British politician
 Bob Spencer (born 1957), Australian rock guitarist
 Bobbie Spencer, a character in General Hospital

See also
 Spencer family